George Albert Routledge (June 22, 1855 – January 3, 1924) was a physician and politician in Ontario, Canada. He represented Middlesex East in the Legislative Assembly of Ontario from 1902 to 1905 as a Liberal.

He was born in Lambeth. Routledge practised medicine in Lambeth from 1875 to 1924. He also served as coroner for Middlesex County.

He was married twice: first to Alice M. Best and, then in 1917, to Emily M. Morgan.

Routledge died at home in Lambeth at the age of 78.

A portrait of Routledge painted by John Wycliffe Lowes Forster is part of the collection of the University of Western Ontario.

References

External links

1855 births
1924 deaths
Ontario Liberal Party MPPs
Physicians from Ontario
Canadian coroners